Herbrand Edward Dundonald Brassey Sackville, 9th Earl De La Warr,  (20 June 1900 – 28 January 1976), styled Lord Buckhurst until 1915 (and sometimes nicknamed "Buck De La Warr" after that), was a British politician. He was the first hereditary peer to join the Labour Party and became a government minister at the age of 23.

He was later one of the few Labour politicians to follow Ramsay MacDonald in the formation of the National Government and the National Labour Organisation. However, he ended his political career by serving as Postmaster General in the last Conservative administration of Winston Churchill.

Background and education
De La Warr was the son of Gilbert Sackville, 8th Earl De La Warr, and Muriel Agnes, daughter of Thomas Brassey, 1st Earl Brassey, eldest son of the railway engineer Thomas Brassey. He was educated at Eton and Magdalen College, Oxford. The son of a Conservative father and Liberal mother, he developed trends towards socialism at university. In 1915 his father was killed in the First World War, and he succeeded to the title as a minor. On reaching 18, he refused as a conscientious objector to take part in active combat, but joined the Royal Naval Reserve (trawler section).

Political career
De La Warr became the first hereditary peer to join the Labour Party, and in February 1924, then aged 23, was one of the youngest ever ministers when he was appointed Lord in Waiting in the first Labour government of Ramsay MacDonald. He made his maiden speech in the House of Lords the same month.

In the second Labour government of 1929 to 1931 he served as Captain of the Honourable Corps of Gentlemen-at-Arms (government chief whip in the House of Lords) and Under-Secretary of State for War between 1929 and 1930, as Parliamentary Secretary to the Ministry of Agriculture and Fisheries between 1930 and 1931 and as a Lord-in-waiting between 1929 and 1931.

In 1931, the Labour government fell and MacDonald formed a National Government. De La Warr was one of only a tiny handful of Labour ministers to join it, and before the 1931 general election was instrumental in the formation of the National Labour Organisation to provide a vehicle of support for MacDonald and other ex-Labour members of the National Government. He resumed office as Parliamentary Secretary to the Ministry of Agriculture and Fisheries, a post he held until 1935, and then served under Stanley Baldwin as Parliamentary Secretary to the Board of Education between 1935 and 1936 and as Under-Secretary of State for the Colonies between 1936 and 1937. In 1936, he was sworn of the Privy Council.

In 1937, new Prime Minister Neville Chamberlain gave De La Warr his first cabinet post as Lord Keeper of the Privy Seal. Like several other younger members of the cabinet, De La Warr found himself disagreeing over the government's foreign policy, and contemplated resigning over the Munich Agreement, but decided not to. In the aftermath of the agreement he was transferred in 1938 to be President of the Board of Education. During his time in this post, it was expected that he would oversee legislation for raising of the school leaving age to 15, but the outbreak of World War II deferred all such plans until the end of hostilities.

In April 1940 De La Warr became First Commissioner of Works in a series of ministerial changes by Chamberlain, but was demoted from the cabinet. The following month Chamberlain was replaced by Winston Churchill, who formed an all-party coalition government, and the objections of the Labour Party to National Labour ministers meant that De La Warr was dropped, and he did not return to government for eleven years.

In 1951, in Churchill's peacetime Conservative government, De La Warr was appointed Postmaster General, and as such, was in charge at the time of the Eastcastle Street robbery, before leaving office for the final time in 1955. He continued to contribute regularly to the House of Lords until 1966, but from then on until his death ten years later only spoke twice, both times in 1972.

Apart from his career in national politics, De La Warr was Mayor of Bexhill-on-Sea between 1932 and 1934 and a Justice of the Peace and Deputy Lieutenant for Sussex. In 1956 he was made a Knight Grand Cross of the Order of the British Empire. The De La Warr Pavilion was built in 1935 in Bexhill-on-Sea and was named after Lord De La Warr. The "De La Warr" in both the pavilion's name and the Earl's name is pronounced "Delaware" (as in the American state named for his ancestor Thomas West, 3rd Baron De La Warr).

Family

Lord De La Warr was twice married. He married firstly Diana Helena, daughter of Henry Gerard Leigh, in 1920. They had two sons and a daughter. Their younger son Thomas Sackville (1922–1943) was killed in action during the Second World War.

After Diana's death in March 1966, he married secondly Sylvia, Countess of Kilmuir, in 1968. She was the daughter of Edith and William Reginald Harrison, widow of David Maxwell Fyfe, 1st Earl of Kilmuir, and the sister of actor Sir Rex Harrison, famously star of the film, My Fair Lady.

One of his sisters was Lady Avice Ela Muriel Sackville (d. 1985). He attended her marriage to Stewart Menzies, (leader of British wartime intelligence or 'C'), dressed in a lower-deck seaman's bell-bottomed uniform.

Death
Lord De La Warr died in January 1976, aged 75, and was succeeded in the earldom by his elder and only surviving son, William. The Countess De La Warr died in June 1992.

Note

References

External links

1900 births
1976 deaths
People educated at Eton College
British conscientious objectors
British Secretaries of State for Education
Labour Party (UK) hereditary peers
National Labour (UK) politicians
Lords Privy Seal
United Kingdom Postmasters General
9
4
Herbrand
Knights Grand Cross of the Order of the British Empire
Conservative Party (UK) hereditary peers
Members of the Privy Council of the United Kingdom
Labour Party (UK) Baronesses- and Lords-in-Waiting
Herbrand Sackville, 09 Earl De La Warr
Honourable Corps of Gentlemen at Arms
Ministers in the Chamberlain wartime government, 1939–1940
Ministers in the Chamberlain peacetime government, 1937–1939
Ministers in the third Churchill government, 1951–1955
Royal Naval Reserve personnel